David Masnata y de Quesada, Marquis of Santa Ana y Santa María, was a Cuban lawyer, professor, historian, and founder of the Instituto Cubano de Genealogía y Heráldica.

Biography
Masnata was born on September 11, 1926. He was the first child of Emilio Masnata y Azcue and Aurora de Quesada y Miranda, grandson of Gonzalo de Quesada, an associate of Cuban revolutionary hero José Martí, and great-grandson of Dr. Ramón L. Miranda, the family physician of José Martí.

Masnata's interest in genealogy and history developed during his early years. He founded the Instituto Cubano de Genealogía y Heráldica (Cuban Institute of Genealogy and Heraldry) in 1950 and served as secretary until 1961. He was also a member of the Sociedad Cubana de Estudios Históricos y Internacionales (Cuban Society of Historical and International Studies) from 1956 to 1961 and was an honorary member of the Academia Mejicana de Genealogía y Heráldica (Mexican Academy of Genealogy and Heraldry) from 1950 to 1988.

Following Castro's communist takeover of Cuba, Masnata moved to New York in 1961 and left behind a large collection of Cuban books and research papers on Cuban and Spanish history, genealogy, and heraldry. While in exile, Masnata compiled a new collection of approximately three thousand books and thousands of records and documents on Spanish and Cuban genealogy. He became a proficient genealogist, and traced his ancestors from the sixteenth century to the early twentieth century.

At the age of twenty-five, Masnata received his law degree from the University of Havana and practiced law in Cuba until 1961. From 1951 to 1961 he was a member of the Colegio de Abogados de la Habana (Bar Association of Havana). He received another degree from New York University in 1967 and entered the Bar Association of New York City in 1969. From 1970 to 1971 Masnata served as a professor at Columbia University. Masnata was acknowledged by the Supreme Court of the United States in 1973 and licensed to practice in Washington, DC, and New York. In 1979, Masnata was licensed to practice law in Spain and became a member of the Ilustre Colegio de Abogados de Madrid.

He received the Prix de Liechtenstein in 1985 from H.R.H. Frank Josef II, Reigning Prince of Liechtenstein, for his work La Casa Real de la Cerd (The Royal House of La Cerd).

David Masnata died in New York on October 5, 1988.

Works or publications

Notes and references

External links
 The David Masnata y de Quesada collection, 1861-1979 is available at the Cuban Heritage Collection, University of Miami Libraries. The David Masnata collection contains research material on Cuban and Spanish genealogy, heraldry and family names.

1926 births
1988 deaths
Cuban emigrants to the United States
Exiles of the Cuban Revolution in the United States
Genealogists
20th-century Cuban lawyers